The members of the Representative Assembly of the New Hebrides from 1975 to 1977 were elected on 10 November 1975.

List of members

References

 1975